Francis Bedford may refer to:

 Francis Octavius Bedford (1784–1858), English architect
 Francis Bedford (photographer) (1816–1894), English photographer
 Francis Bedford (bookbinder) (1799–1883), English bookbinder
 Francis Donkin Bedford (1864–1954), English artist and book illustrator